The 1960 Isle of Man TT was the second round of the 1960 Grand Prix motorcycle racing season. It took place between 13 June and 17 June 1960 at the Snaefell Mountain Course.

Senior TT (500 cc) classification

Junior TT (350 cc) classification

Lightweight TT (250 cc) classification

Ultra Lightweight TT (125 cc) classification

Sidecar TT classification

External links
 Detailed race results

References

Isle of Man Tt
Tourist Trophy
Isle of Man TT
Isle of Man TT